Horrell is a surname. Notable people with the surname include:

Horrell Brothers, five brothers from Texas who were outlaws of the Old West
Andrew Horrell (born 1988), New Zealand rugby union player
Edita Horrell, Lithuanian mountaineer and humanitarian aid worker
Edwin C. Horrell (1902–1992), American football player and coach
Elizabeth Horrell (1826–1913), New Zealand teacher and homemaker
Ryan Horrell (born 1973), former English cricketer

See also
Horrell Hill, South Carolina, in Lower Richland County, South Carolina
Orrell (disambiguation)